This was the first edition of the tournament, Julio Peralta and Horacio Zeballos won the title defeating Guillermo Durán and Máximo González in the final 6–2, 6–3.

Seeds

Draw

References

 Main Draw

Corrientes Challenger - Doubles